The Cono Sur or Lima Sur (South Lima in english) is one of the five areas that make up the Lima Metropolitan Area. It is located in the southern part of the metropolis hence its name. This socioeconomic levels of this district are varied. Most of the population however belongs to the lower and middle classes. But it is the area closest to the districts of the modern zone and residential areas like Miraflores, La Molina, Santiago de Surco, etc. Many of the residents belonging to these districts are immigrants from various regions of the country. As they settled there, some developed successful communities such as Villa El Salvador, while others still live in poor housing known as Pueblos jóvenes. The area is popular for its beaches, farms and factories in that population greatly increases during the summer months.

Districts 
The following districts are part of Lima Sur:

Barranco (currently part of the Modern districts)
Chorrillos
Lurín
Pachacamac (currently part of the Cono Este)
Pucusana
Punta Hermosa
Punta Negra
San Bartolo
San Juan de Miraflores
Santa María del Mar
Villa el Salvador
Villa María del Triunfo

References

Geography of Lima